Nandigram Vidhan Sabha constituency is an assembly constituency in Purba Medinipur district in the Indian state of West Bengal. The General election to the Legislative Assembly of West Bengal for 292 constituencies out of the 294 constituencies in West Bengal was held between 27 March to 29 April 2021 in eight phases. Voting for the two remaining constituencies was delayed and was scheduled to be held on 16 May 2021. Polling in Nandigram took place on 1 April.

On 18 January Mamata Banerjee announced at a rally in Nandigram that she would contest the upcoming assembly elections from Nandigram. Hours later, Suvendu Adhikari, her close aide turned rival, declared he would defeat the CM by a margin of at least 50,000 votes or quit politics.

On May 2, the returning officer declared Suvendu Adhikari to be winner after 17 rounds of counting. Mamata Banerjee called the result fraud and decided to move High Court over recounting. Due to BJP's overall loss in the state election, Nandigram seat became a battle of prestige.

Background

Electoral system 
Outlined in Article 168 of the Constitution of India, the West Bengal Legislative Assembly is the only house of the unicameral legislature of West Bengal and not a permanent body and subject to dissolution. The tenure of the Legislative Assembly is five years from the date appointed for its first sitting unless dissolved sooner. Members of the Legislative Assembly are directly elected by the people. The tenure of current West Bengal Legislative Assembly is scheduled to end on 30 May 2021.

Political developments 
In the 2019 general elections AITC won 22 and the BJP won 18 of the 42 Lok Sabha seats in West Bengal. Bagging 40 percent of the vote share, an increase from the previous time and in by-elections from 2016 to 2021, BJP had also increased their seats in the legislative assembly by 31 as of 2021 through defections from TMC, Congress and Left leaders. According to various political analysts, the shifting of left and other opposition voters towards the BJP caused the meteoric rise in BJP's vote share.
Some Left cadres went to the house of the locals and had reportedly said "This time Rama (indicating BJP as 'Jay Shree Rām' is the slogan used by the Saffron Party), next time Left." (Later on Mamata Banerjee said "CPM's harmads are all in BJP now. On the day of polling in Nandigram Suvendu said to mediapersons "All of them (pointing to his companions who were shouting 'Jay Shree Rām') are old Leftists. This Amdabad region is a stronghold of the Leftists. They are all with me.")

Adhikari attempted communal polarisation in Nandigram and started saying things that attempt to divide Hindus and Muslims.

On 10 March Banerjee filed her nomination at the Haldia sub-divisional office headquarters. Around 6:15 pm she got injured when she was about to leave the Birulia market area. She alleged that she was pushed by "four-five people" who manhandled her and slammed the door of her car on her foot. Banerjee was taken to SSKM Hospital in Kolkata for treatment. BJP MP Subramanian Swamy had directly made a call to Mamata Banerjee's office and inquired about the health of the Chief Minister. Later, he also gave a statement wishing her recovery. A day after being injured, Mamata released a video message urging people and party workers to be calm and exercise restraint. Two days after being admitted, she left the hospital on a wheelchair with her left foot plastered. Doctors at the SSKM Hospital took the decision after the Trinamool supremo repeatedly requested them to discharge her from the medical establishment. Eyewitness Nitai Maity, a sweet shopkeeper, had said "The crowd was already there. But as soon as the car arrived, it was as if the area was flooded with people. There was a bit of pushing. In the meantime, Mamata Banerjee had just opened the front door of the car and had just stepped out. Suddenly there was a push from outside and the door closed. Mamata Banerjee suddenly fell to the ground with a severe leg injury."  Medinipur DIG Kunal Agarwal, District Magistrate Bivu Goel and Superintendent of Police Praveen Prakash went to Birulia Bazar in Nandigram on Thursday morning to collect statements of eyewitnesses before sending their report to the Election Commission. TMC and BJP workers clashed in front of the DM and the SP.

On 13 March Samyukt Kisan Morcha (SKM) addressed a mahapanchayat at Nandigram and appealed to the local public not to vote for the BJP.

Yashwant Sinha joined TMC at Trinamool Bhavan on the same day. About this decision he said “The tipping point was the attack (the alleged Nandigram incident in which Mamata hurt her left foot). This (BJP) government can do anything to win an election,” and that he will work together with Mamata Banerjee to save democracy. “She has always been a fighter” said Sinha while disclosing that Mamata had offered to be a hostage as part of a negotiation strategy during the Kandahar hijacking crisis. “She was ready to make the ultimate sacrifice for the country” Sinha added.

On 15 March Adhikari sought removal of Banerjee's electoral roll from Nandigram alleging that the Bengal CM withheld information about six criminal cases against her while filing her nomination affidavit. News came in later that at least one of the cases mentioned by BJP — a CBI case in Asansol — had to do with “a different Mamata Banerjee and not the Bengal CM”. On 17 March local women protested with brooms and shoes before Suvendu's convoy in Nandigram. On the same day TMC demanded cancellation of the nomination of Suvendu Adhikari alleging that Adhikari filed “false particulars of his residence” in his nomination paper. Next day, Nandigram was heated around Suvendu Adhikari's programme. Trinamool and BJP workers clashed in Sonachura. Several people from both sides were admitted to the hospital in bloody condition. On 22 March Trinamool's Rajya Sabha MP Derek O’Brien lodged a complaint to Election Commission that Suvendu was giving shelter to 'outsiders' at four houses of Nandigram, mentioning addresses of each houses. The next day, Kakoli Ghosh Dastidar told ABP Ananda that BJP goons are terrorising the people of Khodambari and Haridevpur (probably mistaken for Haripur) in Nandigram. On 26 March Suvendu had to face another protest while campaigning in Nandigram. On the same day, Derek O’Brien and Kakoli Ghosh Dastidar complained to EC that Suvendu was gathering miscreants in some constituencies to create unrest. Next day, a woman was injured in bombing and TMC blocked road in protest. On 30 March Suvendu Adhikari shared a fake post which claimed that he was about to win in Nandigram according to a survey done by Kolkata TV.

On the eve of polling in Nandigram, Election Commission ordered the transfer of the sub-divisional police officer of Haldia and the circle inspector of Mahishadal in Purba Medinipur district to non-election assignments and imposed Section 144 in that constituency. Sisir Adhikari's telephonic conversation got viral on the same day. Sisir had called up Kaizar Sheikh, the TMC president of Amdabad II (a gram panchayat of Nandigram II block) and urged him to help get votes in favour of his son Suvendu Adhikari. Later, Kaizar said "I will not respond to the calls of 'gaddars' (traitors), who left the party after making a huge amount of money. I am a true liutenant of Mamata Banerjee and would continue to be the same." A BJP worker was arrested from Sonachura of Nandigram in the act of supplying bombs on the night before the polls. He was told to do this by a BJP leader.

On the day of second phase polling i.e. 1 April, tensions erupted over allegations of bombings in some places and obstruction of voting in booths. Allegations of obstruction of voting against BJP were made in booths 13, 14, 18, 19 and 20 of Boyal While visiting booths in Nandigram Suvendu had to face 'go back' slogans at Satengabari. At afternoon the Chief Minister visited some booths across the Nandigram constituency where local TMC leaders complained that their election agents were not being allowed to enter booths.

A day after the polling, stray clashes took place between workers of the TMC and the BJP in some parts of Nandigram.

On 8 April the EC issued a notice to Suvendu Adhikari for communal overtones in his 29 March speech in Nandigram. In that speech Suvendu was making references to one "Begum" (a veiled dig at Mamata Banerjee). In his reply to the EC notice, Suvendu Adhikari claimed that he never made any personal attack or derogatory remarks against any political leader. However, on 13 April, the EC issued a warning to him for making derogatory statements in his speech.

Events on and after the day of counting 
The votes were counted on 2 May. All eyes were set on the updates of high-voltage Nandigram constituency. 17 rounds of counting was to be done before declaring the winner. Mamata Banerjee was trailing in initial rounds. The EC informed that announcement of results for Nandigram would be delayed because of problem in server. In the 16th round, when the counting of votes in Gokulnagar panchayat area started, Mamata fell behind. After the 16th round, the counting of 17th round was delayed by an hour. According to the staffs involved in the counting, postal ballots were being counted at that time. At the end of the seventeenth round, it was announced that Mamata Banerjee had won. Though later, it was declared that Suvendu had defeated (his) former party leader by approximately 1,956 votes. According to the Election Commission's final data, a total of 228,405 valid votes were counted. Both sides continued to claim that they won Nandigram. Security was beefed up in the vicinity of the Haldia counting centre amid fears of unrest.

Union Ministers Rajnath Singh and Nirmala Sitharaman congratulated Mamata Banerjee on Twitter for her party's victory. Jay Prakash Majumdar, Vice President of BJP West Bengal, congratulated Ms Banerjee from BJP's press conference.

While TMC was leading in West Bengal, Prashant Kishor (who repeatedly claimed beforehand that the BJP won't cross double digit in the results of this election) made the announcement of quitting the profession of election strategist. Talking about his experience in Bengal, Kishor alleged that the campaigning was made difficult due to Election Commission's bias and the TMC went through "hell" to fight the propaganda built by the BJP to showcase that it was winning. "EC is working like the extension of the BJP," said Kishor. At 4:25 pm ANI announced that Mamata Banejee had defeated Suvendu Adhikari by a margin of over 1,200 votes. According to another source, this margin was 3,717. Jay Prakash said to the press "Suvendu Adhikari has given a tough fight to the Chief Minister of Bengal. For this, he deserves applause."

After winning legislative election, Mamata Banerjee walked outside her residence and told her supporters, "I request all to not take out victory processions. I urge everyone to go back to their homes now. I would like to thank everyone. This is the victory of Bengal's people and Bengal. Only Bengal can (achieve such a feat)." Mamata Banerjee, in her first press conference post victory, announced that TMC will celebrate their victory at Brigade after the COVID situation improves. She made a request to the Central Government to give free vaccines to all countrymen (earlier she had written to the PM seeking permission to “purchase vaccination doses directly with state funds and launch a massive free vaccination campaign in the state covering the entire population”) and also alerted that if they don't do this, she will start her nonviolent movement in front of Gandhi Statue. "I am proud to say that Bengal saved the country" she said. "Election Commission fought with us just like a BJP spokesperson. When I raised the issue for Nandigram, you didn't believe that how they looted (votes). They (EC) have shut down the server (at Nandigram) for about three hours, they announced the victory and after that they are saying something else. Some cheating is going on. We will fight this in the Court. We will file a case and fight for this. That's only one seat and we don't mind for that because Bengal won the match. Don't worry for Nandigram, for a struggle you have to sacrifice something. I struggled for Nandigram because I fought a movement. It's okay. Let the Nandigram people give me whatever verdict they want, I'll accept that. All it matters that we gained landslide victory and BJP has lost the election.”

A delegation of TMC leaders Derek O’Brien, Kalyan Banerjee, Firhad Hakim and Atin Ghosh went to the office of Election Commission in demand of recounting in Nandigram and submitted a letter to the Commission alleging fraud in the Nandigram count. In addition to demanding recounts, various problems and inconsistent aspects of the counting process were highlighted. For example, the counting process was stalled from time-to-time, which was not reported by the commission; there has been tampering and mismanagement of numbers from the EVM; invalid votes in favour of BJP have been counted; valid votes cast in favour of the other side (i.e. TMC) have not been counted; there were inconsistencies in the counting of postal ballots. They requested in writing to recount the votes of Nandigram Centre with postal ballots. They complained that Mamata Banerjee's demand for a recount was refused by the Returning Officer 'for reasons unknown', which is not good at all in the eyes of the law.

Though Suvendu Adhikari was officially declared winner in Nandigram by the Election Commission, he lost the battle to retain the so-called Adhikari stronghold. The TMC had practically won the whole of Medinipur. It was clear from the results of the 2021 election that the Adhikaris dominated the region at the mercy of the TMC. Out of 16 seats in East Midnapore, 9 went to the Trinamool. In West Midnapore, 13 out of 15 seats were occupied by TMC. In Jhargram, the ruling party won all of the 4 seats. The BJP had won only 2 of the 8 assembly seats in the Tamluk Lok Sabha constituency, from where Suvendu had previously won twice. Leaving Nandigram and Haldia, the Trinamool bagged the rest of it. It is worth mentioning that the incumbent MP from Tamluk Lok Sabha constituency is Dibyendu Adhikari, the brother of Suvendu Adhikari. Not only that but the BJP was practically lagging behind TMC in the booth (booth no. 83 of ward no. 15 of Kanthi municipality) of Kanthi in East Midnapore where the members of the Adhikari family cast their votes. According to the data released by the commission, the BJP was trailing behind the Trinamool Congress by not one or two, but 54 votes.

Speaking to mediapersons at her Kalighat office on 3 May, Mamata Banerjee said that she received an SMS by 11 pm on previous night. The returning officer of Nandigram had written this message to one of his acquaintances (whose identity she didn't disclose). She called a person to read it loud. It read "Sir It is not my preview (probably a mistake for 'purview'). Sir, plz save me. My family will ruin. I have no other option but to commit suicide. Life threat is coming. I may be murdered. I had nothing to do. Plz forgive me. I have a little daughter." After it was read, Ms Banerjee said "The returning officer says if he orders a recount, his life could be at stake. Do you understand what that means, what happened there? Same result everywhere. And in one place, eight thousand votes suddenly became zero! The server (of EC) was down for four hours. Then there was forty minutes of load shedding. The machine (EVM) was changed. (The BJP) has done a lot. What is there to fear if a recount was demanded? Anyone can officially demand for a recount. Why the Election Commission did not order for recount? What is their interest? You have seen the deadly words of the recounting officer that he had to work at the gun point. He could not work because he had life threat. What is this? Every reporter had seen and announced (my victory), the Election Commission had announced, the Governor called me (to congratulate). Then everything turned upside down! I have never seen such 'mafiagiri'. Anyway, we want it to be judged. We will definitely move to the Court. Our party workers have started a movement (in Nandigram). EC has to give in writing that EVMs, VVPAT, postal ballots should be kept in a separate place so that the EVMs don't get tampered and if those had been tampered, there will be a forensic audit. Until those are kept in separate custody, their movement will continue." She also said that the two observers sitting there (inside the counting centre) were very biased and their aim was to defeat her anyhow. Mamata also took a jibe at Prime Minister Narendra Modi, alleging he did not call to congratulate her on the TMC's win. Mamata said, "This is the first time a prime minister did not call."

The Election Commission wrote a fresh letter to the West Bengal chief secretary directing to take all appropriate measures to keep a strict watch and monitor on a regular basis the security provided to the returning officer of Nandigram. The EC has also asked that the officer should also be extended appropriate medical support and counselling. The West Bengal government informed the EC that it has, on the latter's directions, provided security to the officer both in person, with two personal security officers assigned for the job, and at his home. The EC clarified that the “returning officer appointed by the poll panel is the final authority under the law” to decide on recounting at Nandigram Assembly constituency, "Since the returning officer has rejected the recount decision, there will be no new recount. That verdict can now be challenged only in the court." Trinamool MP Sukhendu Sekhar Roy had spoken out against the commission's decision. He said "The Election Commission is now trying to cover the fish with vegetables (i.e. to hide in a superficial way). Our question is, how was the server down for four hours? Why was the counting of votes stopped for two hours? Why did the postal ballot counting suddenly start in the midway? The commission says the agents have signed the document after each round of counting, we will verify that." He said "If anyone's life is in danger, the administration will look into that matter. The administration will take appropriate steps in that regard. In that case political party has nothing to do. But the commission is talking so much on Tuesday. Until Monday night, providing security was the responsibility of the Election Commission."

In the meantime a recorded phone call got leaked. Pralay Pal, a BJP leader of Nandigram was at one end of the audio and at another end was Suvendu Adhikari. Pralay Pal admitted that he had talked to Mr. Suvendu over the phone to inform him about the violence that followed the election results. However, he claimed that he did not leak the audio. After the results were announced on Sunday, the mobiles of several leaders of Nandigram, close to Suvendu Adhikari, were switched off on Monday. Meanwhile, clashes took place in various zones since Monday morning. Mr. Pralay necessarily called Suvendu as he could not communicate with the leaders close to Suvendu. Even in that situation, Suvendu Adhikari could be heard laughing over the phone. He expressed anger over why Hindus did not vote for the BJP in alliance. 'Will Mr. Suvendu decide whom the Hindu community should vote for? Or has the BJP taken the contract of Hinduism?' asked many as the audio surfaced. Suvendu named Birulia besides other places (Gokulnagar, Sonachura, Boyal) as their (BJP's) 'safe zone' in Nandigram. It was also known from the audio that Suvendu keeps militants. A part of the audio is like this - Pralay: "The Hindus of Kendemari roughly voted for us." Suvendu: "Still there is five thousand lead in Kendemari." Pralay: "Yes they have taken (the lead)." Suvendu: "Let our militants stay here for 15 days/one month. Now there is nothing (that they have to do). I will arrange for them to stay and eat. Tell them to come with clothes, towels. Let them stay with me for one month."

Since Suvendu was declared winner, TMC workers had started protesting outside the counting centre. The area was heated up as soon as the BJP candidate reached the counting centre in Haldia from Kolaghat Guest House to pick up his certificate on Sunday evening. Trinamool supporters staged a massive protest surrounding Suvendu's car after seeing him. Central Forces were protecting Suvendu's car while it took a round turn and left the area. TMC workers alleged that the counting was stopped for 3 hours, the result was overturned after power cut and their agent was beaten up and expelled (from the counting centre) by the central force (or miscreants brought by Suvendu Adhikari). From the night of 2 May TMC workers and supporters started dharna in front of SDO Office at Manjushree crossing in Haldia demanding recount in Nandigram. Hundreds of policemen and central troops were deployed around the counting centre. "We will continue our sit-down strike until the EC gives order for recounting. If police touches anyone then the intensity of the sit-down strike will take another level" said Suprakash Giri. "The EC was biased from day one. When BJP demanded a recount in Moyna, an Assembly constituency next to ours, the votes were counted again last night. And then the TMC candidate lost. However, the EC didn't listen to our request for recount in Nandigram." On 5 May, TMC held an all-day long dharna in Bagmari at the junction of Beleghata and Maniktala constituencies demanding recount in Nandigram. Kunal Ghosh was present on the dharna manch. In Nandigram, staunch TMC leaders and supporters didn't allowed to take the EVMs out of Haldia counting centre. On the night of 5 May when on-duty Central Force personnel and the police tried to bring those EVMs out they had an altercation with protesting TMC workers. Allegedly baton charge was launched at protesters after that. Trinamool leaders blocked the road at the Manjushree crossing for an hour on next day morning, accusing the central forces of attacking them. The newly appointed District Magistrate Purnendu Kumar Maji came to the spot to talk with the TMC activists. He promised to keep the EVMs in a safe place. TMC activists-supporters lifted the blockade after receiving assurance that the counting would be done again if ordered. They came forward to get the EVM machines out from the counting centre of Haldia Govt. Sponsored High School. Trunk number 33, loaded with six EVMs was found unlocked. Police immediately confiscated those EVMs. Naturally question arose if those EVMs had been replaced during counting. Sheikh Azgar Ali, vice-president of the District Trinamool Youth Congress, said "The box contained EVMs of 10 booths in Gokulnagar Gram Panchayat area. The EVMs were sealed. But it only has the signature of the BJP's counting agent, not the signature of the TMC's agent. Mamata Banerjee had advanced by 8,000 votes before the counting of votes of the booths in Gokulnagar." The SDO said "EVMs are stored in the strongroom for up to 45 days after the count. A box without a lock came into notice. Trinamool has complained to the Returning Officer." 12 uncounted EVMs, all of them filled with votes were also recovered from the counting centre after the new district magistrate and SP took charge. These EVMs were used in several booths in the minority inhabited Samsabad area of Nandigram. On the day of counting, the power supply to the counting centre was cut off for about 40 minutes and it is feared that EVMs had been replaced at that time. TMC alleged that EVMs were replaced with the help of Suvendu's close police officer and the Election Commission. Around 11:30 am the sealed containers, loaded with EVMs and postal ballots were taken to the permanent strong room of the ADM office under the security of the Central Forces and in the presence of Sub-Divisional Magistrate (ADM) Abneet Punia.

Court proceedings 
On 17 June the news came that Advocate Sanjay Basu had filed an election petition before the Calcutta High Court on behalf of Mamata Banerjee challenging the verdict of Nandigram. A single-judge bench of Justice Kaushik Chanda is likely to hear the case via video conference by 11 a.m. on the next day.

Ms Banerjee's petition was briefly heard on Friday morning by Justice Chanda. Soumendra Nath Mukhopadhyay, the lawyer of the CM, mentioned before the court to hastily ascertain the date of the court hearing. Chanda said that in case of an election petition the petitioner must be present in the court and asked S. N. Mukhopadhyay if the petitioner will appear in person at the hearing of the case. To which S. N. Mukherjee replied citing a ruling by the Supreme Court that the petitioner's presence in the court is not necessary and she can be present virtually if the court wants so. Justice Chanda agreed with him and adjourned the case to June 24. Chanda directed the Calcutta High Court administration to look into whether the case was properly filed under the Representation of the People Act.

Four more election related cases came up for hearing in other single benches of four judges of the High Court. In three of the cases, Justices Shuvra Ghosh, Vivek Chowdhury and Shubhashish Dasgupta directed the returning officers of the respective polling centres to keep all the documents related to the polling. Each case was filed on behalf of the defeated TMC candidate from the respective constituency. The plaintiffs are Alo Rani Sarkar (Constituency: Bangaon South, Losing margin: 2,004), Manas Mazumder (Constituency: Goghat, Losing margin: 4,147), Sangram Dolui (Constituency: Moyna, Losing margin: 1,260) and Shantiram Mahato (Constituency: Balarampur, Losing margin: 423) respectively. Lawyers for the latter, Lalit Mahato and Sujoy Mandal, said the court was satisfied that the case had been filed properly under the Representation of the People Act, not the constitution or civil law. Therefore, on this day, the judge directed to preserve all the documents and equipment related to the voting at Balarampur polling station until the decision of the case is taken. It is to be noted that the main allegation of the plaintiff was that after the final count, he was ahead by 1,021 votes but he was declared defeated by 423 votes. On the other hand, plaintiffs Alo Rani Sarkar and Manas Mazumder took part in hearings through virtual mode. The same instructions were given to the returning officers in their cases. (BJP candidate Kalyan Chaubey filed a case in Calcutta High Court challenging the verdict of Maniktala constituency on 4 July, although 45 days had already passed since declaration of results. He lost the Maniktala seat to TMC's Sadhan Pande by almost 20,000 votes but still claimed to have won by 3,363 votes. BJP's Jitendra Tiwari had also challenged the outcome of Pandabeswar constituency on 29 June and the Calcutta High Court on 14 July admitted his election petition for hearing.) Alo Rani Sarkar's case was again heard on 16 July where she alleged that Swapan Majumder of BJP, the winning BJP candidate from Bangaon South, had given false information in his affidavit and he continued to campaign secretly even after the end of the campaign. Bigger than that, the central jawans have exerted influence over the voters there. Justice Vivek Chowdhury questioned if any election can be canceled on the charge of exerting influence of the jawans. Therefore, it was informed that a hearing will be held on July 30 to verify the admissibility of this case.

On 24 June Ms. Banerjee appeared for the hearing virtually for a brief time. Appearing for her, senior advocate Abhishek Manu Singhvi sought the recusal of Justice Chanda from hearing the case. Justice Chanda did agree that the petitioner's arguments behind removal of the case to a different bench were valid. After the hearing, he reserved order on the plea seeking his recusal.

On 27 June, the Bar Council of West Bengal wrote a letter to the CJI, seeking removal of the Acting Chief Justice Rajesh Bindal of Calcutta High Court. They alleged that Justice Bindal's partiality is visible especially in cases of the state government. In the letter, they pointed out the role of Bindal in cases like Narada and Nandigram. In September the Supreme Court Collegium, headed by CJI N. V. Ramana, recommended that Justice Bindal be transferred as the chief justice of Allahabad High Court and Justice Prakash Shrivastava be appointed as chief justice of Calcutta High Court. Justice Shrivastava took oath as the chief justice on 11 October.

On 7 July, Kaushik Chanda decided to step away from the case. He imposed a penalty of ₹5 lakh on Mamata Banerjee for seeking his recusal from her election petition and directed to deliver that amount to the State Bar Council. Abhishek Singhvi had earlier said to Justice Chanda "We knew that the case would be heard in the bench of Justice Sabyasachi Bhattacharya. Suddenly on 16 June we came to know that the case has come to your bench." Sheikh Sufiyan said "We cannot accept the decision of penalty. We will move to the Supreme Court."

On 12 July, it was learned that the bench of Justice Shampa Sarkar will hear the Nandigram case. The hearing is likely to take place on 14 July.

On 14 July, the high court issued a notice to Suvendu Adhikari. The court also issued notices to the Election Commission, the state electoral officer and the returning officer with a direction to keep all election-related records intact until the case was heard. 12 August was assigned as the next date of hearing. Suvendu, on the other hand, moved the Supreme Court seeking transfer of Banerjee's election petition case outside the state.

On 12 August, Suvendu's lawyers submitted before the court of Justice Sarkar that the legislator has approached the Supreme Court seeking transfer of the case from West Bengal. In keeping with the respondent's prayer, Justice Sarkar adjourned the hearing to 15 November.

"A booth had 500 voters and 1,000 votes were polled there. VVPATs were not counted. Machines were crushed." Mamata Banerjee mentioned, regarding the rigging process in Nandigram election, during a workers' convention at Bhabanipur that took place on 8 September. She repeated those claims on 24 September.

On the morning of November 15, Suvendu Adhikari appealed to the High Court to adjourn the hearing of the Nandigram vote recounting case in the High Court until disposal of his transfer application of the case by the Supreme Court. A bench of Justice Hima Kohli in the Supreme Court was scheduled to hear the case on the same day but it seemed that the hearing would not take place as the judge was not present. During the hearing in the High Court, Advocate General Soumendranath Mukherjee, who was questioning on behalf of Mamata Banerjee, opposed Suvendu's petition. It was decided that the next hearing of the case would be on December 1, but before that, by November 29, all the parties would have to submit a written 'minute' where it would be written which party wanted to ask questions on which matter. The High Court asked Suvendu to submit a written statement on why he had no confidence in the Calcutta High Court by November 29. On the other hand, while observing the hearing of Nandigram case in the Supreme Court, Justice Hima Kohli told Mahesh Jethmalani, the advocate of Suvendu Adhikari, that the misconception that the High Court would not give a fair trial is not correct at all. Finally, the judge said that the case would be heard again in two weeks' time.

The hearing in Supreme Court was scheduled to take place on 29 November.

On 1 December, Suvendu Adhikari submitted his written statement to the High Court. A single bench of Justice Shampa Sarkar informed that as a case in this regard was pending in the Supreme Court, the case was not being heard in the High Court at that time. The next hearing of the case was scheduled for 8 January.

In the meantime, BJP's expelled Howrah district president Surajit Saha claimed that men were sent from Howrah to Nandigram on the instructions of the party to make Suvendu victorious.

Adhikari's petition seeking transfer of the Nandigram case from the state was set to be heard in the Supreme Court on 3 January 2022. A single bench of Justice Hima Kohli ordered 14-day stay on the appeal.

Election results

2021 
In the 2021 elections, Suvendu Adhikari of Bharatiya Janata Party defeated his nearest rival Mamata Banerjee of Trinamool Congress. But this result remains controversial to date.

|-
! style="background-color:#E9E9E9;text-align:left;" width=225 |Party
! style="background-color:#E9E9E9;text-align:right;" |Seats won
! style="background-color:#E9E9E9;text-align:right;" |Seat change
|-
| style="text-align:left;" |Trinamool Congress
| style="text-align:center;" | 9
| style="text-align:center;" | 4
|-
| style="text-align:left;" |Bharatiya Janata Party
| style="text-align:center;" | 7
| style="text-align:center;" | 7
|-
| style="text-align:left;" |Communist Party of India (Marxist)
| style="text-align:center;" | 0
| style="text-align:center;" | 2
|-
| style="text-align:left;" |Communist Party of India
| style="text-align:center;" | 0
| style="text-align:center;" | 1
|-
|}

See also 
 2016–21 West Bengal Legislative Assembly by-elections
 2016 West Bengal Legislative Assembly
 2021 elections in India
 2019 Indian general election in West Bengal
 2018 West Bengal Panchayat elections
 2018 Tripura Legislative Assembly election

References

Notes

Citations

External links
 West Bangal General Legislative Election at the Election Commission of India

2021 West Bengal Legislative Assembly election
State Assembly elections in West Bengal
2020s in West Bengal